Vocal Play is a South Korea variety show program on Channel A starring Noh Hong-chul and Oh Sang-jin as the main host for season 1 and Yoo Se-yoon and Oh Sang-jin for season 2. The first season aired on Channel A, it started on November 10, 2018 and ended on January 26, 2019. The second season started on October 5, 2019. It is distributed and syndicated by Channel A every Saturday at 22:20 (KST).

Synopsis 
This is the 1st Korean A cappella music show where the singers have to sing without instrumental accompaniment.

Rules

Season 1 
Performers are further split into 4 types: A cappella groups, Beatboxers, 4 hidden Solo Vocalists and Solo Vocalists. Each producer must pick at least 1 of each category. For pure singers, music with vocals removed (MR) can only be used in round 1. As they perform 100 Vocal Peers vote to unlock the draft wall for the producers to see the acts. The wall can only be unlocked once it reaches 70 votes. The producers can vote for the rights to mentor them.

Once the teams are assembled, each type of performers will first compete against each other from different producer's teams. Afterwards, they will compete as a team and collaborate in various stages.

Casts

Season 1

MC 
 Noh Hong-chul
 Oh Sang-jin

Producers 
 Yoon Sang
 Yoon Il-sang
 
 Sweet Sorrow

Participants
Khan
H-Has
Hiss 
MayTree
VRomance
EXIT
G2
Bae Da-hae 
Paradise 
Hanhae
Mighty
Kwon Hyuk-soo
Wing
Greg
Park Ji-min
U Sung-eun

Season 2

MC 
 Oh Sang-jin
 Yoo Se-yoon

Judges 
 Ailee
 
 Sweet Sorrow
 Lee Seok-hoon

Ratings 
 Ratings listed below are the individual corner ratings of Vocal Play. (Note: Individual corner ratings do not include commercial time, which regular ratings include.)

Season 1

Season 2

References

External links 
 Season 1 Official Website 
 Season 2 Official Website 
 Official YouTube Channel

South Korean variety television shows
South Korean television shows
Channel A (TV channel) original programming
2018 South Korean television series debuts
Korean-language television shows
Pages with unreviewed translations